23 Librae (23 Lib) is a star in the zodiac constellation Libra, making it visible from most of the Earth's surface. With an apparent visual magnitude of 6.45, it requires dark skies and good seeing conditions to see this star with the naked eye. It has a planetary system with two confirmed extrasolar planets.

Properties
The spectral properties of 23 Librae identify it as stellar class G5 V, with the luminosity class of 'V' indicating that this is a main sequence star that is generating energy through the thermonuclear fusion of hydrogen at its core. This energy is being radiated from the outer envelope at an effective temperature of about 5,585 K, giving it the yellow hue typical of G-type stars. Estimates of the age of 23 Librae range from 8.4 to 11.1 billion years, making it much older than the Sun.

23 Librae is slightly larger than the Sun, with an estimated 107% of the Sun's mass and 125% of the Sun's radius. The abundance of elements other than hydrogen and helium, what astronomers term the star's metallicity, is higher than in the Sun. It appears to be rotating slowly, with the projected rotational velocity of 2.2 km∙s−1 giving a lower bound to the actual azimuthal velocity along the equator.

Planetary system
In November 1999 an exoplanet 23 Librae b was announced orbiting 23 Librae, and in 2009 an additional planet was detected. Examination of the system in the infrared using the Spitzer Space Telescope did not reveal any excess emission, which might otherwise suggest the presence of a circumstellar  debris disk of orbiting dust.

In popular culture

In the Halo franchise, the star system is home to the planets Hesiod, farther away from the star, and Madrigal in the habitable zone.

See also
 Lists of exoplanets

References

External links
23 Librae (Solstation)

Libra (constellation)
Librae, 23
Durchmusterung objects
134987
074500
5657
0579.4
G-type main-sequence stars
Planetary systems with two confirmed planets